Sunset Speedway is a NASCAR sanctioned 1/3 mile semi-banked short track motor racing oval, located forty minutes north of Toronto, in the town of Innisfil, Ontario, Canada. Sunset’s weekly Saturday night racing program runs from May to September each year, featuring Junior Late Models, Bone Stocks, Mini Stocks, Super Stocks and Late Models. The track regularly features touring series including the NASCAR Pinty's Series, APC United Late Model Series, OSCAAR Modifieds, Hot Rods and Outlaw Super Late Models.

History
In operation since 1968, new ownership purchased the speedway in May 2009 and upgraded the facility. The track asphalt was replaced, grandstands were repaired and a pit road was added for traveling series. Following the closure of nearby Barrie Speedway in 2015, NASCAR moved its weekly NASCAR Advance Auto Parts Weekly Series to the track and it hosted the NASCAR Pinty's Series for the first time that season.

NASCAR Pinty's Series

The NASCAR Pinty's Series made its first trip to Sunset Speedway for the first running of the Leland Industries 300 presented by Johnsonville on July 20, 2015. Alex Tagliani won the inaugural event and repeated the victory in 2016. After a three year absence, NASCAR announced the Pinty's Series would return to the track in 2020.

Photo gallery

See also
List of auto racing tracks in Canada
Barrie Speedway

References

External links

 Sunset Speedway Official Site
 NASCAR Sunset Speedway page

Motorsport venues in Ontario
Paved oval racing venues in Ontario
Motorsport in Canada
1968 establishments in Ontario
Sports venues completed in 1968
NASCAR tracks
Tourist attractions in Simcoe County